Chaharmahal and Bakhtiari Province (Ostân-e Čahâr-Mahâl-o Baxtiyârî) is one of the 31 provinces of Iran. It lies in the southwestern part of the country, with an area of 16,332 square kilometers. Its capital is Shahr-e Kord. At the 2006 census, the province's population was 843,784 in 194,171 households. The following census in 2011 counted 895,263 people in 234,416 households. At the 2016 census, the province's population was 947,763 in 270,434 households.

The province was classified as part of Region 2 upon the division of the provinces into 5 regions solely for coordination and development purposes on June 22, 2014.

Administrative divisions

Cities 
According to the 2016 census, 607,444 people (over 64% of the population of Chaharmahal and Bakhtiari province) live in the following cities: Aluni 5,248, Ardal 10,113, Babaheydar 11,202, Bazoft 1,519, Ben 12,971, Boldaji 11,980, Borujen 57,071, Chelgerd 2,989, Cholicheh 4,945, Dashtak 4,016, Dastana 5,143, Faradonbeh 13,317, Farrokh Shahr 31,739, Farsan 30,504, Gahru 6,263, Gandoman 6,291, Gujan 6,179, Hafshejan 21,352, Haruni 3,601, Junqan 14,433, Kaj 4,227, Kian 12,948, Lordegan 40,528, Mal-e Khalifeh 4,024, Manj 1,492, Nafech 4,059, Naghan 6,125, Naqneh 9,923, Pardanjan 8,699, Saman 14,192, Samsami 1,203, Sar Khun 2,131, Sardasht 5,691, Sefiddasht 5,471, Shahr-e Kord 190,441, Shalamzar 6,899, Sudjan 5,581, Sureshjan 12,308, Taqanak 6,170, and Vardanjan 4,456.

Languages 

Bakhtiāri, which belongs to the Luri language of the Iranian language family, is the province's main language. Bakhtiāri is primarily spoken in the valleys of the higher areas in the western half of the province. It is also spoken in the lower areas around Lordegān in the south, and by speakers who have moved into the cities in the north-east.

In the north-east quarter of the province, people in most cities and villages speak either Chārmahāli (also in the Southwestern branch of Iranian) or Chaharmahali Turkic. Chārmahāli is transitional between Bakhtiari and Persian varieties of Esfahan Province, but more similar to the latter. Chārmahāli varieties spoken in cities include Dehkordi (in Shahr-e Kord), Ghafarrokhi (in Farrokh Shahr), Heysheguni (in Hafshejān), and Borujeni (in Borujen). There are also many other varieties of Chārmahāli spoken in rural areas. Most types of Turkic spoken in this province are similar to Qashqa’i of Fars Province, but they are transitional to the Āzarbāyjāni (Azerbaijani) language of north-west Iran. The Chārmahāli and Turkic language areas overlap with one another, and in the foothills of the Zagros and in the larger cities, they intermingle with Bakhtiāri as well.

Tehrani-type Persian is now being taught by parents to children as a first language in some parts of the province, with the highest concentrations in the cities.

The Atlas of the Languages of Iran (ALI) published a series of language maps for Chahar Mahal va Bakhtiari Province, including a point-based and polygon (area-based) language distribution maps, and several linguistic data maps.

Written descriptions of some of the Bakhtiāri varieties in the province. and a lexicon of the Bakhtiāri language have also been published.

Economy 

The province is mainly active in the agriculture sector. Most of the industrial sector is clustered around the center of the province.
 
The province has the potential to become a vibrant tourist attraction because of its natural resources.

Natural attractions 
Chaharmahal and Bakhtiari province is the source and birthplace of many springs, rivers and waterfalls that supply the water of the two great and vital rivers of Zayanderud and Karoon and cause the development of many cities in the country. Natural attractions include Zayanderud river, Zamankhan bridge, Kouhrang 1 Dam, Dime spring, Sheik Ali Khan waterfall, Chama Ice cave, Darkesh varkesh canyon, Rostam Abad Sardab spring, Do Polan, Karoon-4 dam, Darreh Esgh (love valley), Atashgah waterfall, Choghakhor Wetland, Pire Ghar cave, Siasard spring, Helen protected area, Barm spring, Sendegan spring, Tang Sayyad national Park, Parvaz national park, Sarab cave, Gandoman wetland, Zard lime waterfall, Kordikon waterfall.

Colleges and universities 
 Islamic Azad University of Borujen
 Islamic Azad University, Shahrekord Branch
 Shahrekord University
 Shahrekord University of Medical Sciences

References

External links 

 Official website of Chahar Mahaal and Bakhtiari Governorship
 Provincial Bureau for Budget, Planning, and Management (سازمان مدیریت و برنامه ریزی)
 Shahrekord Municipality (شهرداری شهرکرد)
 Provincial Bureau for Telecommunications (شرکت مخابرات)
 Provincial Bureau of Industries and Mines
  Provincial Department of Transportation (سازمان حمل و نقل و پایانه‌ها)
  Provincial Bureau of Economics and Finance Affairs (سازمان امور اقتصادی و دارائی)
  Provincial Department of Education (سازمان آموزش و پرورش) 
 Provincial Bureau of Taavon (اداره کل تعاون)
 Provincial Department of Utilities (سازمان آب وفاضلاب روستایی)
 Shahrekord Central Post Office (اداره کل پست)
 Provincial Department of Medical Insurance (بیمه خدمات درمانی)
  Provincial Bureau of Agricultural Jihad (سازمان جهاد کشاورزی)
  Provincial Welfare Organization (سازمان بهزیستی)
  Provincial Department of Social Security (اداره کل تامین اجتماعی)
  Provincial Meteorological Service (اداره کل هواشناسی)
 Chahar Mahal va Bakhtiyari Attractions
 Atlas of the Languages of Iran (ALI) - Chaharmahal and Bakhtiari

 
Provinces of Iran
Lur people